The Junior Eurovision Song Contest 2013 was the 11th edition of the annual Junior Eurovision Song Contest. It took place in Kyiv, Ukraine on 30 November 2013. The venue for the contest was announced on 10 April 2013, as the Palace "Ukraine". Ukrainian broadcaster National Television Company of Ukraine (NTU) was the host broadcaster for the event. It was also the second time in the history of the Junior Eurovision Song Contest that the event took place in last year's winning country, as well as the first time that the event was held in the same city twice.

Gaia Cauchi representing  won the contest with the song "The Start". This was Malta's first Junior Eurovision victory as well as their first victory in any Eurovision competition. It also marked the first time in the history of the contest that a winning entry was sung entirely in English. This was also the first contest to introduce a new awards system: The winning country along with the second and third place countries each received a trophy. Sofia Tarasova, representing the host nation , took second place and Ilya Volkov singing for  took the third-place trophy.

Location 

On 17 April 2013, the Ukrainian national broadcaster NTU and the European Broadcasting Union (EBU) announced that the venue for the 2013 contest would take place in the Palace "Ukraine", in Kyiv. The venue which is also known as the Ukrainian National Palace of Arts, better known as Palace "Ukraine" which is a venue administered by the State Directory of Affairs inside their public enterprises division and is one of the main venues for official events along with Palace of Sports in Kyiv, Ukraine, which hosted the 2009 contest.

It was opened in 1970 as the biggest centre of culture and arts. The building was designed by a group of architects P. Zhylytskyi, I. Vayner, under the directorship of the project's author the distinguished architect of Ukrainian SSR Yevhenia Marychenko. All of the architects were awarded Shevchenko National Prize (1971) for its design and construction. The building is trapezoidal, twenty eight meters tall and consists of over 300 rooms.

Format 

The executive supervisor of the Junior Eurovision steering group, Vladislav Yakovlev, announced on 17 July 2013 that there would be some changes being introduced to the contest from 2013 onwards. The contest would no longer focus on just the winning entry, but would also award prizes to the top three entries in acknowledgement of the talents of the young performers.

It was also announced that the winner of Junior Eurovision 2013 would be at the Eurovision Song Contest 2014, however the role that they would play had not been revealed at that time.

On 7 October 2013, it was announced that the executive supervisor managed to maintain the participation of thirteen countries for the contest in Kyiv, Ukraine. The name of the thirteenth country was expected to be announced by the European Broadcasting Union on 29 October 2013. It was later confirmed on 1 November 2013 that Cyprus were going to be the thirteenth country but withdrew at the last minute. The running order draw took place on 25 November 2013 during the contest's opening party.

Graphic design
Designer Elias Ledakis, who was responsible for the stage design of the Eurovision Song Contest 2006 in Athens, Greece, was announced on 7 October 2013 as also being the designer for the 2013 Junior Eurovision stage.

Radio broadcast
The official Junior Eurovision Twitter account revealed on 9 October that the contest was planned to be broadcast online and by national broadcasters, however the details were still being worked on. Radio Ukraine International would also be broadcasting the contest live.

Hosts

On 30 September 2013, it was confirmed that Timur Miroshnychenko would host the contest alongside Zlata Ognevich.

Opening and interval acts
The show began with two children, Andriy Boiko and Liza Kostiakina, doing a puzzle of this year’s logo, Puzzle Man. The opening number featured several fairytale scenes with dancers and musicians on the stage, with LED screens and movable parts and puzzle pieces floating above the stage also featured. The interval acts were Emmelie de Forest performing "Only Teardrops", all participants performing the theme song "Be Creative", last year's winner Anastasiya Petryk and Zlata Ognevich also performed on stage. Some hours before the start of the contest Ruslana withdrew from performing at the event, motivated by the violent actions of the Ukrainian authorities against the pro-European Union protests that were happening near the contest's venue.

Participants and results 

Awards were given to the top three countries, after all the votes were cast; these were Malta, Ukraine and Belarus.

Detailed voting results

12 points 
Below is a summary of all 12 points received. All countries were given 12 points at the start of voting to ensure that no country finished with nul points.

Spokespersons 

The order in which each country announced their votes was in the order of performance. The running order draw took place on 25 November 2013 during the contest's opening party. The spokespersons from all of the participating countries are shown below alongside their respective country.

 Anastasiya Petryk
 Lova Sönnerbo
 Lyaman Mirzalieva
 David Vardanyan
 Giovanni
 Sofija Spasenoska
 Liza Arfush
 Sasha Tkach
 Denis Midone
 Elene Megrelishvili
 Alessandro Wempe 
 Maxine Pace
 Mariya Bakhireva

Other countries

 On 27 September 2013 the head of the Albanian delegation, Kleart Duraj informed ESCkaz.com that Radio Televizioni Shqiptar (RTSH) had withdrawn after making the début in the Junior Eurovision Song Contest 2012 due to not finding a suitable act to represent the nation.
 Flemish broadcaster Vlaamse Radio- en Televisieomroeporganisatie (VRT) owner of children's channel Ketnet, announced it would not participate in the 2013 contest, and instead focusing on creating a new talent show for young performers in Belgium. They did, however, hold a national final, which was won by 14-year-old Pieter Vreys.
 Bulgarian broadcaster Bulgarian National Television (BNT) announced that they would not return to the contest in 2013. However, they were currently planning to return in the future.
 Cypriot broadcaster Cyprus Broadcasting Corporation (CyBC) were in discussions with the EBU as to being the thirteenth country in Junior Eurovision, however after a board meeting an invitation to take part was declined.
 On 21 October 2013 it was announced by EscPlus that Israel would not be taking part in the 2013 contest.
 An announcement was made by Latvian broadcaster Latvijas Televīzija (LTV) that they would not return to the 2013 contest.
 Portuguese broadcaster Rádio e Televisão de Portugal (RTP) announced that they would not return to contest in 2013, due to the realisation of the Little Singers Gala in Figueira da Foz.
 Yago Fandiño, director of children's programs of TVE stated on 7 September 2013 that TVE and the EBU were negotiating its return. Fandiño explained that since the EBU has redesigned the format of the Junior Eurovision Song Contest, TVE would check if the initiatives make into a format more suitable for the younger audience. If so, the country would have probably returned to the competition.

Broadcasts 

Most countries sent commentators to Kyiv or commentated from their own country, to add insight to the participants and, if necessary, provide voting information. For the first time, the official Junior Eurovision website featured commentary online during the broadcast with commentary from the website's editor Luke Fisher and radio broadcaster Ewan Spence.

Official album

Junior Eurovision Song Contest Kyiv 2013 a compilation album put together by the European Broadcasting Union, was released by Universal Music Group on 22 November 2013. The album features all the songs from the 2013 contest, along with karaoke versions. This is the first Junior Eurovision album to only be released digitally.

See also
 ABU TV Song Festival 2013
 Eurovision Song Contest 2013
 Eurovision Young Dancers 2013
 Turkvision Song Contest 2013

References

External links

 
2013
2013 in Ukraine
2013 song contests
Music in Kyiv
2010s in Kyiv
Events in Kyiv
November 2013 events in Europe